Endri Çajku (born 25 February 1982, in Korçë) is an Albanian retired footballer who played for Skënderbeu Korçë, Partizani Tirana and Pogradeci during his career.

Honours
KS Pogradeci
Albanian First Division (1): 2010–11

References

1982 births
Living people
Footballers from Korçë
Albanian footballers
Association football midfielders
KF Skënderbeu Korçë players
FK Partizani Tirana players
KS Pogradeci players
Kategoria Superiore players
Kategoria e Parë players